VVS may refer to:

Company
 Videoville Showtime, a Canadian motion picture distribution company

Organisations
 Verkehrs- und Tarifverbund Stuttgart, the regional transport authority of Stuttgart, Germany
 Flemish Union of Students (Vlaamse Vereniging van Studenten), the national union of students in Flanders
 Visakha Valley School, an Indian school at Visakhapatnam
 Vasant Valley School, an Indian school in New Delhi
 Netherlands Society for Statistics and Operations Research (VVS)
 Vereniging Voor Sterrenkunde, the Flemish society of amateur astronomers; see SKEPP
 Voenno-Vozdushnye Sily ("military-air forces"), the Soviet Air Force (before 1991)

People
 V. V. S. Laxman (born 1974), Indian cricketer

Other uses
 Vulvar vestibulitis syndrome, a syndrome of vulvodynia associated with chronic disease
 Vasovagal syncope
 Vid Vintergatans slut (English: At the end of the Milky Way), a Swedish TV-series for children on SVT
 Varuthapadatha Valibar Sangam, a 2013 Tamil film
 Very Very Slightly Included, a way of describing the clarity of a diamond
 Vertical Video Syndrome, internet slang for the act of recording video using an upright mobile phone, as if taking a portrait photograph (rather than standard landscape video, as would generally be displayed on a TV or monitor)
 Validated Vulnerability Scanning - A type of network security testing where a human operator will validate vulnerability scans from automated tools.
 VVS (song) - 2020 song by Mirani, Mushvenom, Khundi Panda, Munchman, and Justhis, title derived from diamond clarity above

See also
 Soviet Air Forces
 Russian Air Force (1991 onwards), the aerial warfare service branch of the Armed Forces of the Russian Federation
 Belarusian Air Force (1995 onwards, in particular), the air force of the Armed Forces of Belarus
 Bulgarian Air Force (Военно-Въздушни Сили), a branch of the Military of Bulgaria
 BBC (disambiguation)